Pierre Antoine Jean-Baptiste Villiers (10 March 1760 – Paris, 21 July 1849) was a French playwright, journalist and poet.

Biography 
A captain of dragoons, author of comedies, dramas and plays in verse, he also published newspapers such as Les Rapsodistes au salon, ou les Tableaux en vaudevilles (1795–1796), in which he wrote critics of the Salon, Rapsodies du jour, ou Séances des deux conseils en vaudevilles (1796–1800), Le Chant du coq, ou le Nouveau Réveil du peuple, Le Chiffonnier, ou le Panier aux épigrammes (which is a sequel to Rapsodies), La Lyre d'Anacréon (1810–1811) and La Macédoine à la Rumfort, journal de littérature et de bienfaisance.

In 1790, by his own testimony in Souvenirs d'un déporté, collection of anecdotes published in 1802, for seven months he served as secretary to Maximilien de Robespierre, then living  in Le Marais, copying several of his speeches and adjusting his spending or cohabited with him. Also the Mémoires by Charlotte de Robespierre mention Villiers.

A Royalist, he was injured on 10 August 1792 while defending the Palais des Tuileries. Similarly, following the Coup of 18 Fructidor an V, he was condemned to deportation but escaped proscription. Reappearing in public partner after the Coup, he devoted himself to literary work. Already a chevalier of the Légion d'honneur, he was made chevalier of the Order of Saint Louis on 18 August 1822

Works 
1795: Quelques idées sur l'éducation publique
1795: Discours prononcé par le citoyen Villiers, capitaine au troisième régiment de dragons et rapporteur du quatrième conseil militaire, séant au Palais de justice, établi pour juger le chef des Chouans, Cormatin et co-accusés, à la séance publique du 21 frimaire, an quatrième de la République française
1796: Portefeuille d'un chouan (with F.-M. Mayeur de Saint-Paul)
1796: L'Ombre de Malesherbes à Isnard, Cadroi et Durand-Maillane
1799: La Constitution en vaudeville, œuvre posthume d'un homme qui n'est pas mort, publiée par lui-même, et dédiée à Madame Buonaparte
1802: Souvenirs d'un déporté : pour servir aux historiens, aus romanciers, aux compilateurs d'ana, aux folliculaires, aux journalistes, aux feseurs de tragédies, des comédies, de vaudevilles, de drames, de mélodrames et de pantomimes dialoguées
1802: Manuel du voyageur à Paris, ou Paris ancien et moderne, contenant la description historique et géographique de cette capitale, de ses monuments, palais, édifices publics, jardins, spectacles, etc., de tout ce qui peut intéresser les étrangers ; suivie de la liste des banquiers, (numerous reprints)
1804: Petites rapsodies
1806: Les Braves anciens et modernes, galerie comparée des maréchaux d'Empire et de quelques maréchaux de France, connétables et grands capitaines des derniers siècles de la monarchie française
1811: Scène lyrique en l'honneur de leurs Majestés impériales et royales, et du roi de Rome
1814: Le Rodeur, ou Choix historique, dramatique, anecdotique, critique et pas du tout politique d'odes, de chansons, de couplets, de bons mots
1824: La France militaire, ou Abrégé de l'histoire de la monarchie française, à l'usage des militaires, 2 vol.
1829: Douze Fables dédiées à Mgr le duc de Montpensier
1835: Les Deux Philippe, le premier apôtre et le premier roi des Français, 1er mai 1835
1836: Minerve, l'aiglon et le hibou, fable, 1er janvier 1836
1836: L'Enfant à baptiser. Au Roi, 1er mai 1836
Le Hibou et la pie, allégorie à S.A.R. le duc de Montpensier, 1er janvier 1837
1837: Au Roi
La Richesse, la volupté, la vertu, la santé. Allégorie. À S.A.R. Mme duchesse Hélène d'Orléans, 1er janvier 1839
1842: Épître à la mort
1842: Le Religieux de l'abbaye de la Trappe, soliloque

Theatre 

1793: Cange ou le Commissionnaire bienfaisant, trait historique in one act (with Armand Gouffé)
1794: Les Dragons français et les hussards prussiens, little one-act play, in prose, mingled with couplets
1794:  Les Bustes, ou Arlequin sculpteur, comedy in 1 act and in prose (with Armand Gouffé), Variétés, 17 ventôse an III)
1797: Bébée et Jargon, one-act rapsody, mingled with couplets, imitated from the opéra Médée, Théâtre Montansier, Palais-Royal, 28 March
1800: Forioso à Bourges, ou l'Amant funambule, one-act comédie en vaudeville
1801: La Guinguette, ou Réjouissances pour la paix, one-act comedy, in vaudevilles (with P.-J.-A. Bonel), Théâtre Montansier-Variétés, 29 pluviôse an IX)
1802: Bizarre, ou C'n'est pas l'Pérou, bizarrerie in 1 act (with Bonel and Claude-Jean Bédéno fils), Théâtre de la Gaîté
1803: Ardres sauvée, ou les Rambures, mélodrame héroïque et historique in 3 acts, extravaganza, in collaboration with J.-G.-A. Cuvelier), la Gaîté, 23 pluviôse an XI
1804: Le Charivari de Charonne, one-act tintamare, imitated from the Désastre de Lisbonne (with H. Pessey), la Gaîté, 14 frimaire an XIII)
1805: Les cosaques, ou le jeune Dodiski historical melodrama in three acts and in prose, la Gaîté, 13 vendémiaire an XIV)
1805:  Félime et Tangut, ou le Pied de nez, three-act mélodrame-féerie (with H. Pessey), la Gaîté, 14 May
1805: Le Jeune d'Aubigné, ou la Nuit de la St-Barthélémy, three-act historical drama, in prose
1803: Le Médecin turc, one-act opéra bouffon (with Armand-Gouffé), Opéra-Comique, 27 brumaire an XII)
1803: 1 et 1 font onze, vaudeville épisodique in 1 act (with H. Chaussier),la Gaîté, 28 July
1804: Le Bouffe et le tailleur, opéra-bouffon in 1 act (with Armand Gouffé), Théâtre Montansier, 21 June
1805: La forteresse de Cotatis ou Zelaïde et Pharès, three-act melodrama, la Gaîté, prairial an XIII)
1807: Rodomont, ou le Petit Don Quichotte, mélodrame héroï-comique, in 3 acts (with Braziers fils and Armand Gouffé), la Gaîté, 7 March)
1808: La femme impromptu, opéra bouffon in one act in prose
1810: Le Valet sans maître, ou la Comédie sans dénouement, bluette inless than one act, in prose, mingled with couplets (with Armand Gouffé), Variétés, 28 July
1810: L'Auberge allemande, prologue in vaudevilles for L'Enfant et le grenadier, Salle des Jeux gymniques, 20 October
1810: L'Enfant et le grenadier, fait et tableaux historiques en 2 actions et à grand spectacle, Salle des Jeux gymniques, 20 October
1811: La Petite Nichon ou La petite paysanne de la Moselle, petits tableaux en une petite action et un petit prologue with Jean Cuvelier, Théâtre de la Porte-Saint-Martin, 23 November
1812: L'Enfant et la poupée, ou le Masque d'airain, tableaux en une action précédée d'un prologue en prose, Salle des Jeux gymniques, 27 February
1817: M. Beldam, ou la Femme sans le vouloir, one-act comedy (with Armand Gouffé),(Variétés, 25 September)
1818: Le Maréchal de Lowendal, ou la Prise de Berg-op-Zoom en 1747, one-act historical fact, Cirque olympique des frères Franconi, 25 April
1818: La Ferme des carrières, historical fact (with H. Franconi), Cirque olympique of the Franconi brothers, 25 November
1819: Catherine de Steinberg, ou le Déjeuner du duc d'Albe, one-act mimo-mélodrame, Cirque olympique of the Franconi brothers, 3 November
1819: Poniatowski, ou le Passage de l'Elster, three-act military mimodrama (with Franconi jeune), Cirque olympique, 11 December
1820: Ugolin, ou la Tour de la faim, three-act mimodrama (with Caigniez), Cirque olympique, 14 December
1821: Rosalba d'Arandês, three-act play, extravaganza (with Caigniez), Théâtre du Panorama dramatique, 23 November
1822:  Le Passage des Thermopyles, two-act mi-modrame, Théâtre du Cirque olympique, 26 December
1824: Le Pied de nez, ou Félime et Tangut, six-act vaudeville féerie (with Désaugiers), Théâtre du Vaudeville, 5 April

Sources 
 Joseph-Marie Quérard, Félix Bourquelot, Charles Louandre, Louis-Ferdinand-Alfred Maury, La littérature française contemporaine. XIXe siècle : Le tout accompagné de notes biographiques et littéraires, Paris, Daguin frères, 1857, tome VI, p. 570
 François Xavier de Feller, Charles Weiss, Claude Ignace Busson, Biographie universelle ou Dictionnaire historique des hommes qui se sont fait un nom par leur génie, leurs talents, leurs vertus, leurs erreurs ou leurs crimes, Paris, J. Leroux, Jouby et Ce, Libraires, 1850, tome VIII, p. 147
 Ernest Hamel, Histoire de Robespierre d'après des papiers de famille, les sources originales et des documents entièrement inédits: d'après des papiers de famille, les sources originales et des documents entièrement inédits, Paris, Librairie internationale, 1865, tome 1, p. 180-182

References

External links 
Manuel du voyageur à Paris, ou Paris ancien et moderne, 1811 edition

18th-century French military personnel
18th-century French male writers
18th-century French dramatists and playwrights
19th-century French dramatists and playwrights
French opera librettists
18th-century French poets
19th-century French journalists
French male journalists
19th-century French poets
Maximilien Robespierre
French counter-revolutionaries
Chevaliers of the Légion d'honneur
Knights of the Order of Saint Louis
1760 births
1843 deaths